The Rochester Knighthawks are a lacrosse team based in Rochester, New York playing in the National Lacrosse League (NLL). The 2022 season will be the team's 2nd season in the league. The original Knighthawks moved to Halifax to become the Halifax Thunderbirds.

Regular season

Current standings

Game log

Roster

Entry draft
The 2021 NLL Entry Draft took place on August 28, 2021. The Knighthawks made the following selections:

References

Rochester Knighthawks seasons
Rochester Knighthawks
Rochester Knighthawks